Pakistan International Container Terminal (PICT) is a container terminal port, located at East Wharf of the Port of Karachi.

History
PICT was established in 2002 to finance, construct and operate a common user container terminal at East Wharf of the Port of Karachi. In 2003, the company went public and was listed on the Pakistan Stock Exchange. 

It was completed in April 2004 to provide services to all shipping lines.

As of 2012, it has a maximum handling capacity of 750,000 TEUs.

In 2012, International Container Terminal Services acquire 35 per cent of the PICT.

Awards

Pakistan Stock Exchange Top 25 Companies Awards
PICT received TOP 25 Companies Award from Pakistan Stock Exchange in the years 2013, 2014, 2015, 2018 and 2019

The company was listed on the Karachi Stock Exchange in 2003.

References

External links

Ports in Karachi
Ports and harbours of Pakistan
Companies listed on the Pakistan Stock Exchange
Companies based in Karachi
Transport companies established in 2002
2002 establishments in Pakistan
2003 initial public offerings
Pakistani subsidiaries of foreign companies